Unregenerate! is a Big Finish Productions audio drama based on the long-running British science fiction television series Doctor Who.

Plot
When an empty TARDIS greets Mel, the trail leads to a decrepit asylum, guarded by armed personnel and populated by screaming inmates… with its most recent addition a mysterious patient known as the Doctor.

Mel must follow clues left by the Doctor to find him and infiltrate a top secret alien medical facility called the Kleise Institute and close down its unethical operations on humans. The aliens are taking beings the day before their chronological death and overwriting their personalities. The Doctor attempted to interfere but was supposedly mentally deranged in an accident with some equipment at the facility (though the actual state of his mental capacity is not clear, but it is hinted he is faking it). For three days the Doctor is detained there. When Mel finally finds the Doctor, they break out in cooperation with other subjects. When one of the people helping the Doctor escape, Louis, is shot, he appears at first to die. Then, just as he appears dead, he begins to regenerate, at which point the Doctor reveals to Mel that he is a fellow Time Lord. In the end, the Doctor reveals that all of the aliens running the Kleise Institute are Time Lords as well, and that they were attempting to figure out if it was possible to put a TARDIS brain in a human body by a commission of the Time Lord High Council.

Cast
The Doctor — Sylvester McCoy
Mel — Bonnie Langford
Professor Klyst — Jennie Linden
Johannes Rausch — Hugh Hemmings
Rigan — Gail Clayton
Louis — Jamie Sandford
Louis #2 — John Aston
Shokhra — Sam Peter Jackson
The Cabbie — Toby Longworth

Notes
An early title for this play was Mark Four.
Chronologically, this is the earliest audio drama to feature the Seventh Doctor.
Jennie Linden previously played Barbara, the granddaughter of Dr. Who, in the 1965 film Dr. Who and the Daleks.
The Doctor's own TARDIS is put into a human form in The Doctor's Wife.

External links
Big Finish Productions – Unregenerate!

2005 audio plays
Seventh Doctor audio plays
Gallifrey audio plays
Fiction set in 2007